The following is a list of biggest lakes of Latvia.

Lakes by area

Lakes by depth

Notes

External links 

 Database of lakes in Latvia

Lists of lakes by country